Amantis subirina is a species of praying mantis native to India.

References

subirina
Mantodea of Asia
Insects of India
Insects described in 1915